Green Lake Glacier is in North Cascades National Park in the U.S. state of Washington and is immediately northeast of Bacon Peak. Green Lake Glacier descends from a ridge extending from the east of Bacon Peak. The ridge is an arête which separates Green Lake Glacier from Diobsud Creek Glacier to the south. Meltwater from the glacier spills over Bacon Lake Falls en route to Green Lake.

See also
List of glaciers in the United States

References

Glaciers of the North Cascades
Glaciers of Whatcom County, Washington
Glaciers of Washington (state)